The siege of Monrovia or Fourth Battle of Monrovia, which occurred in Monrovia, Liberia between July 18 and August 14, 2003, was a major military confrontation between the Armed Forces of Liberia and LURD rebels during the Second Liberian Civil War. The shelling of the city resulted in the deaths of some 1,000 civilians. 

Thousands of people were displaced from their homes as a result of the conflict. By mid-August, after a two-month siege, Liberian president Charles Taylor went into exile and peacekeepers arrived as a result of the siege.

Background
In early 2003, a rebel group, the Movement for Democracy in Liberia (MODEL), emerged in the south, and by the summer of 2003, Taylor's government controlled only a third of the country.  Despite some setbacks, by mid-2003 LURD rebels controlled the northern third of the country and was threatening the capital.

Timeline
On August 14, rebels lifted their siege of the city and 200 United States Marines landed to support a West African peace force.

Women of Liberia

The Christian and Muslim women of Monrovia joined forces to create a peace movement called Women of Liberia Mass Action for Peace. Thousands of women mobilized their efforts, staged silent nonviolence protests and forced a meeting with President Charles Taylor and extracted a promise from him to attend peace talks in Ghana. The women of Liberia became a political force against violence and against their government. 

Their actions brought about an agreement during the stalled peace talks. As a result, the women were able to achieve peace in Liberia after a 14-year civil war and later helped bring to power the country's first female head of state, Ellen Johnson Sirleaf. The story is told in the 2008 documentary film Pray the Devil Back to Hell.

See also
Pray the Devil Back to Hell

References

Monrovia
Monrovia
Monrovia
2003 in Liberia
July 2003 events in Africa
August 2003 events in Africa
Battles in 2003
Battles involving Liberia